Michigan's 19th Senate district is one of 38 districts in the Michigan Senate. The 19th district was created by the 1850 Michigan Constitution, as the 1835 constitution only permitted a maximum of eight senate districts. It has been represented by  Sean McCann since 2023, succeeding Republican John Bizon.

Geography
District 19 encompasses parts of Kalamazoo and Van Buren counties.

2011 Apportionment Plan
District 19, as dictated by the 2011 Apportionment Plan, was based in Battle Creek and covered all of Barry, Calhoun, and Ionia Counties. Other communities in the district included Ionia, Albion, Marshall, Springfield, Level Park-Oak Park, Hastings, Middleville, Belding, Portland, Emmett Township, Bedford Township, and Pennfield Township.

The district was located entirely within Michigan's 3rd congressional district, and overlapped with the 62nd, 63rd, 86th, and 87th districts of the Michigan House of Representatives.

List of senators

Recent election results

2018

2014

Federal and statewide results in District 19

Historical district boundaries

References 

19
Barry County, Michigan
Calhoun County, Michigan
Ionia County, Michigan